Welsby is a coastal locality on Bribie Island in the Moreton Bay Region, Queensland, Australia. In the  Welsby had a population of 5 people.

Geography
Welsby is the central part of Bribie Island. The Pumicestone Channel (also known as Pumicestone Passage) is its western coastal border and the Coral Sea is its eastern coastal border. Almost all of Welsby is within the Bribie Island National Park or the Bribie Island State Forest. Apart from these protected areas, the remaining land is a very narrow strip along the west coast beside the Pumicestone Channel.

Welsby has the following points:

 Gallagher  Point
 Mission Point
Offshore are the following marine passages:
Welsby has the following passages:

 Gallagher Gutter close to the western shore extending into White Patch to the south
 Pumicestone Channel further offshore on the western side extending from Moreton Bay at Bongaree on the south-westernmost part of Bribie Island through Welsby to the very northernmost tip of Bribie Island (Bribie Island North) where it connects to the Coral Sea at Caloundra
 Skirmish Passage close to the eastern shore extending from Bribie Island North through  Welsby and south to Woorim (the most south-eastern part of Bribie Island)
 North West Channel further off the eastern shore extending from Kings Beach at Caloundra, past Bribie Island North and Welsby, to Woorim
Poverty Creek flows into the Pumicestone Channel.

There are two lagoons on the eastern shore of the locality:

 Mermaid Lagoon
 Welsby Lagoon

History

The locality is named for Thomas Welsby, a Queensland politician who enjoyed yachting and fishing in Moreton Bay.

At the  Welsby had a population of 4 people.

In the  Welsby had a population of 5 people.

Education
There are no schools in Welsby. The nearest government primary school is Banksia Beach State School in neighbouring Banksia Beach to the south. The nearest government secondary school is Bribie Island State High School in Bongaree to the south.

Attractions 
Wild Banks is a  artificial reef in the Moreton Bay Marine Park offshore on the western (ocean) side of  Welsby. This reef has a number of "fish cages" which are designed to attract pelargic fish species such as mackerel, dolphin fish and wahoo.

References

External links 

 

Suburbs of Moreton Bay Region
Bribie Island
Localities in Queensland